Revizor is a Ukrainian social reality TV show about the quality of service sector establishments in Ukraine. It is broadcast on Novyi Kanal, and began on August 27, 2011.

Series overview 
Revizor was broadcast in Ukraine in following order:

 Season 1: August 27, 2011
 Season 2: January 4, 2012
 Season 3: March 4, 2013
 Season 4: March 3, 2014
 Season 5: March 2, 2015
 Season 6: August 31, 2015
 Season 7: March 7, 2016
 Season 8: July 30, 2017
 Season 9: September 30, 2018

About 
Revizor, the first social Ukrainian reality show, is produced by Novyi Kanal. The crew started the project in collaboration with leading hotel inspectors, restaurants and various parts of the service sector to educate consumers about the level of service in these establishments.

The first season, which began on August 27, 2011, demonstrated the necessity of the project. The show made it to the Book of Records Ukraine, gaining more than 72 thousand users on its official Facebook page at the time of the premiere.

In 2012, "Auditor" received a national award for the television show "Triumph", because of the value and quality of the project and noted professionals. 
In 2013, the project was nominated for the categories "Best Infotainment Program" and "Best Leading entertainment". 
In 2013, the "Revizor" won an award for "Favorite TV-Show". 
In 2014, the presenter Olha Freimut won the "TV Star" (magazine - Telenedelya) as host of Revizor.
In 2013, the format of Revizor on Novyi Channel TV bought "Friday". 
In Russia, the program goes by the name Revizorro and is hosted by Olga Romanovskaya. Now on air, "Friday!" is the fourth season.

The first and second seasons involved restaurants trying to confound the team's attempts at inspection. Restaurateurs and hoteliers locked doors, insulted the crew and stretched hands. They did everything to avoid Revizor paying attention to detail.

On March 4, 2013, the third season began. The team went to the facilities that had already been tested with repeated revisions. The Task awarded institutions that proved that they were now worthy of recommendations. The tests were not the main innovation of the third and fourth seasons. Gold plates increased the demands on the quality of institutions. Recommendations on the Silver during the first and second season were declared invalid on January 1, 2013. During the repeated revisions, the original "Silver" plates were taken. In the case of confirmation of hygiene standards, the recommended institutions were handed new golden plates. In the case of failure, no replacement was offered, and the "Silver" plates were taken by the crew.

In addition, during the third season the crew of Revizor inspected facilities in other European countries: Austria, France, Italy and the UK.

During the 4th season, innovation was the post-show passion of Revizor. The hotel yeram and restaurateurs who passed the check were given a public recommendation by the Revizor. This provoked a variety of scandals in the studio shows.

On March 2, 2015, on Novyi Channel, the fifth season was launched with a new presenter, Vadim Abramov. The recommendations of this season are bi-metal - Silver and Gold. From this season onwards, the inspector could leave a "black mark" - the label Revizor "does not recommend" in the book of complaints and suggestions from institution's discrepancy evaluation criteria. Another difference is that the season is now an important part of tasting dishes at restaurants, and they stay as Hotels' Examiner.

In the fifth season, the Inspector started checking supermarkets, markets, pumproom resorts and water parks.

Evaluation criteria 
Evaluation criteria have strict and invariable figure (location), such as interior, quality of service, cleanliness, pricing and features, which create a good atmosphere. Supermarket criterion for assessing the feature is replaced with "safety". Revizor does not co-operate with the institutions in their order, does not advertise them, does not receive money for the visits and shooting in their territory. All bills are paid by the New Channel.

The purpose of the Revizor is not to destroy the business, not to scare the customers, not to show off dirty laundry in a poorly cleaned hotel room. They are to help employees and the owners of establishments to see the weakness in their work, they do not see through their own employment and daily routine. They also showed consumers how to service and how to defend their rights.

References

Ukrainian reality television series
Novyi Kanal original programming